List of Faroese members of the parliament of Denmark. The Faroe Islands elect two members for the Danish parliament. From 1849 to 1953 the Folketing was one of the two houses in the bicameral parliament known as the Rigsdag; the other house was known as the Landsting.

The Folketing before 1953

The Landsting before 1953

The Folketing after 1953

References 

 
Folketing
Faroese
Folketing members